Luke Skyler Rockhold  (born October 17, 1984) is an American retired mixed martial artist. He is best known for his time in the Ultimate Fighting Championship (UFC), where he competed in the Light Heavyweight and Middleweight division. He is a former UFC Middleweight Champion. A two-time world champion, Rockhold also won the Strikeforce Middleweight Championship, he defended the title twice and was the last man to hold the belt before Strikeforce was officially absorbed by the UFC in 2013. Rockhold is also an avid surfer, skateboarder,
and a professional model having modeled at the New York Fashion Week and as the face of Ralph Lauren's "Polo Blue" fragrance.

Background
Rockhold was born on October 17, 1984, in Santa Cruz, California from an athletic family. Growing up, Luke and his older brother, pro-surfer Matt Rockhold, surfed their local breaks together. His father was a professional basketball player in Europe and his mother was an avid tennis player. Luke started training in judo when he was 6 years old but quit upon turning ten. When he entered the seventh grade, he joined his school's wrestling team and stuck with the sport all throughout his time at Soquel High School while taking jiu-jitsu classes. Rockhold's great grandfather was a full blood Native American. He is also of German, Irish and English descent.

Rockhold tried wrestling for a local community college but decided to take jiu-jitsu on full-time. After winning a few BJJ tournaments, he decided to enter mixed martial arts. In 2006, a friend invited Rockhold to train at the American Kickboxing Academy (AKA) in San Jose, California. His raw talent and kicking displays immediately caught the eye of AKA head coach Javier Mendez, who touted Rockhold as a potential future champion.

Mixed martial arts career

Early career
In July 2007, Rockhold made his professional debut against Mike Martinez for the Melee on the Mountain promotion. Rockhold dominated the fight and won via armbar submission midway through the first round. In his second fight for the promotion, in November 2007, Rockhold was defeated by Tony Rubalcava via TKO.

Strikeforce
Up-and-coming promotion Strikeforce called and offered Rockhold a fight on their Strikeforce: Young Guns II card. Rockhold looked impressive in his debut, forcing his opponent to submit from punches. Impressed with his performance, Strikeforce decided to give him another fight. The second fight took place on the Strikeforce: Destruction card, which Rockhold won via submission. At Strikeforce: Shamrock vs. Diaz, Rockhold won his third consecutive fight. Rockhold was given a step up in competition when he fought Cory Devela at Strikeforce Challengers: Villasenor vs. Cyborg. Even though he was the underdog going into the fight, he won that fight in just 30 seconds with his third rear-naked choke submission in a row.

At Strikeforce Challengers: Gurgel vs. Evangelista, Rockhold defeated The Ultimate Fighter 7 contestant, Jesse Taylor. The fight improved his record to 5–0 under the Strikeforce banner. In February 2010, Rockhold defeated another Ultimate Fighter 7 finalist, Paul Bradley, and won via TKO (knees to the body). The fight took place at Strikeforce Challengers: Kaufman vs. Hashi in San Jose, California. With the win, Rockhold hoped to fight against tougher and well-known fighters. In addition to the win, Rockhold was announced as a playable character for the EA Sports MMA video game. Rockhold was scheduled to fight Matt Lindland at Strikeforce: San Jose but pulled out a few weeks before the fight due to a shoulder injury. Rockhold was expected to face former title contender, Tim Kennedy, at Strikeforce 32; however, for unknown reasons, Rockhold was removed from the bout.

Winning the middleweight title
After more than a year and a half hiatus from fighting due to injuries, Rockhold stepped into the cage to fight Strikeforce Middleweight champion Ronaldo Souza on September 10, 2011. He won the fight via unanimous decision (50–45, 48–47, and 48–47) to become the new Strikeforce Middleweight champion. For his first title defense, Rockhold faced Keith Jardine at Strikeforce: Rockhold vs. Jardine on January 7, 2012. Rockhold won the fight via TKO in the first round.

In his second title defense, Rockhold faced Tim Kennedy in the main event of Strikeforce: Rockhold vs. Kennedy on July 14, 2012. During the weigh-ins for the bout on July 13, Rockhold came in a half-pound overweight. Rockhold cut the extra weight in the allotted two-hour limit. He successfully defended his title for a second time, winning the fight via unanimous decision (49–46, 49–46, and 49–46).

For his third title defense, Rockhold was expected to face challenger Lorenz Larkin at Strikeforce: Cormier vs. Mir on November 3, 2012 in Oklahoma City, Oklahoma.  However, Rockhold was forced to withdraw from the show due to injury and the event was later cancelled. The fight was rumored to be rescheduled on January 12, 2013. However, Rockhold never agreed to the bout, citing a lingering shoulder injury.

Ultimate Fighting Championship
In January 2013, the Strikeforce organization was closed by its parent company Zuffa. A list of fighters scheduled to be brought over to the Ultimate Fighting Championship was released in mid-January and Rockhold was one of the fighters listed.

Rockhold faced perennial multi-divisional contender Vitor Belfort on May 18, 2013 in the main event at UFC on FX 8.  He lost the fight via knockout in the first round, after being caught with a spinning heel kick to the face.

Rockhold was expected to face Tim Boetsch on October 19, 2013 at UFC 166.  However, Rockhold was forced out of the bout, citing a knee injury, and he was replaced by C.B. Dollaway. Rockhold faced Costas Philippou on January 15, 2014 at UFC Fight Night 35. He won via TKO in the first round after dropping Philippou with a kick to the body. The performance also earned Rockhold a $50,000 Knockout of the Night bonus. Rockhold eventually faced Tim Boetsch on April 26, 2014 at UFC 172. He won the fight via submission in the first round.

Rockhold faced Michael Bisping on November 8, 2014 at UFC Fight Night 55. He won the fight in the second round, after dropping Bisping with a head kick and then applying a guillotine choke submission. The win earned Rockhold his first Performance of the Night bonus award.

On April 18, 2015, Rockhold faced former UFC Light Heavyweight Champion Lyoto Machida  at UFC on Fox 15.  Rockhold defeated Machida in a one-sided fight via submission in the second round.  Rockhold also earned his second consecutive Performance of the Night bonus award.

Winning the UFC middleweight title

Rockhold next faced Chris Weidman for the UFC Middleweight Championship on December 12, 2015 at UFC 194. Rockhold won by technical knockout in the fourth round and became the 7th middleweight champion in UFC history. Both participants were awarded Fight of the Night honors. In the post-fight interview, Rockhold illuminated his struggles prior to the fight: he had been battling a staph infection and was on antibiotics, which made him exhausted during the later rounds of the fight. Being a Santa Cruz native and becoming the UFC Middleweight Champion, his hometown Santa Cruz, California, proclaimed December 18, as Luke Rockhold Day crediting his victory and achievements.

Post championship
A rematch with Weidman was scheduled to take place on June 4, 2016 at UFC 199. However, Weidman pulled out of the fight on May 17 with a cervical disc herniation, and he was replaced by Michael Bisping. His title match against Bisping ended in the first round when Rockhold was dropped with a left hook and finished with a flurry of punches against the cage. This result was considered by many in MMA media as one of the biggest upsets in the UFC title fight history, Bisping being a huge underdog because he took the fight in only 10 days and had been submitted by Rockhold 18 months earlier.

Rockhold was expected to face Ronaldo Souza in a rematch on November 27, 2016 at UFC Fight Night 101. However, the pairing was cancelled on November 1, after Rockhold was ruled out of the contest after sustaining an undisclosed injury. As a result, Souza was also removed from the card.

Rockhold faced former two-time WSOF champion David Branch on September 16, 2017 at UFC Fight Night 116 after being away from the sport for almost 15 months due to injuries. He won the fight by forcing Branch to tap out from his punches in the second round.

Rockhold was scheduled to fight on February 10, 2018, at UFC 221 against UFC Middleweight Champion Robert Whittaker. On January 13, 2018, it was reported that Whittaker pulled out from his bout against Rockhold at UFC 221 due to a serious condition of staph infection. He was replaced by Yoel Romero in a bout for the Interim UFC Middleweight Championship. The winner of this bout would then face Whittaker for a title unification bout. At the UFC 221 weigh-ins, Romero weighed in at 187.7 pounds, 2.7 pounds over the middleweight championship limit of 185.0 pounds. As a result, Romero was ineligible to win the championship even if he won the fight, while Rockhold would have received the Interim Championship if he had won. Romero was also fined 30% of his purse, which went to Rockhold. After a slow start, Romero knocked Rockhold out in the third round.

Rockhold was briefly linked to a light heavyweight bout with Alexander Gustafsson on August 4, 2018 at UFC 227. However, Rockhold later re-injured his leg in training and the fight was scuttled.

A rematch with Chris Weidman was expected to take place on November 3, 2018 at UFC 230. However, on October 19, 2018, it was reported Rockhold withdrew from the bout, citing an injury, and he was replaced by Ronaldo Souza.

Move to light heavyweight
In December 2018, Rockhold announced he will be moving up to light heavyweight due to ever-increasingly harder weight cuts that have led to numerous injuries during training. Rockhold's light heavyweight debut took place against Jan Błachowicz on July 6, 2019 at UFC 239. Rockhold lost the fight via knockout in the second round.

2021 and beyond
After a two year lay off, Rockhold was expected to face Sean Strickland in a middleweight bout on November 6, 2021 at UFC 268. However, on October 11 Rockhold withdrew due to a herniated disc.

Rockhold was scheduled to face Paulo Costa on July 30, 2022, at UFC 277. However, the bout was postponed to August 20, at UFC 278. Rockhold lost the fight via unanimous decision. The fight earned him the Fight of the Night award. Rockhold retired from mixed martial arts after the fight. Although Rockhold retired from MMA competition, he has been vocal about his interest in pursuing a career in boxing. In January 2023, Rockhold announced that he had negotiated a release from his UFC contract and would come out of retirement to compete for another MMA organization.

Bare-knuckle Fighting Championship career

Bare Knuckle Fighting Championship 
On March 1, 2023, BKFC president Dave Feldman announced that Rockhold had signed with Bare Knuckle Fighting Championship. He is set to make his debut against Mike Perry at BKFC 41 on April 29, 2023.

Other ventures

Modeling career
Rockhold signed up for the New York model management agency, Soul Artist Management, the same agency that found fellow UFC fighter Alan Jouban and jump started the career of Channing Tatum. Luke has since had his first spread released as a professional model. With his modeling career quickly picking up steam, he revealed that he would have no problem taking an indefinite hiatus from the Octagon in order to pursue his newly found modeling career. He has also modeled at the New York Fashion Week.

Face of Ralph Lauren cologne
In 2018 Rockhold became the new face of Ralph Lauren's "Polo Blue" cologne fragrance.

The Millionaire Matchmaker reality show
Rockhold was featured as a guest on The Millionaire Matchmaker reality show on Bravo TV in 2015. On the show he dated mixologist, Kara. Rockhold departed the show after asking Kara an inappropriate question. He defended himself by saying that the comment was a scripted joke and that the editor dubbed it in the scene later on.

Personal life
Rockhold dated Grammy Award nominated singer and actor Demi Lovato for a few months in late 2016. The duo made their first public appearance while attending UFC 205 together, at Madison Square Garden in New York. They split in January 2017.

Championships and accomplishments

Mixed martial arts
Ultimate Fighting Championship
UFC Middleweight Championship (One time)
Fight of the Night (Two times) vs. Chris Weidman and Paulo Costa
Knockout of the Night (One time) vs. Costas Philippou
Performance of the Night (Two times) vs. Michael Bisping and Lyoto Machida
Strikeforce
Strikeforce Middleweight Championship (One time; final)
Two successful title defenses
Tied most finishes in Strikeforce history (7)
Most submissions in Strikeforce history (5)
Sherdog.com
 2015 All-Violence First Team
2014 Submission of the Year vs. Tim Boetsch
 2014 All-Violence First Team
Fight Matrix.com
 2015 Upset of the Year vs. Chris Weidman
 2015 Most Noteworthy Match of the Year vs. Chris Weidman

Brazilian Jiu-Jitsu
International Brazilian Jiu-Jitsu Federation
2007 IBJJF World Jiu-Jitsu Championships Purple Belt No-Gi Gold Medalist
2007 IBJJF World Jiu-Jitsu Championships Blue Belt Gold Medalist
2006 IBJJF Pan American Championships Blue Belt Silver Medalist

Mixed martial arts record

|-
|Loss
|align=center|16–6
|Paulo Costa
|Decision (unanimous)
|UFC 278
|
|align=center|3
|align=center|5:00
|Salt Lake City, Utah, United States
|
|-
|Loss
|align=center|16–5
|Jan Błachowicz
|KO (punches)
|UFC 239 
|
|align=center|2
|align=center|1:39
|Las Vegas, Nevada, United States
|
|-
|Loss
|align=center|16–4
|Yoel Romero
|KO (punches)
|UFC 221
|
|align=center|3
|align=center|1:48
|Perth, Western Australia, Australia 
|
|-
|Win
|align=center|16–3
|David Branch
|TKO (submission to punches)
|UFC Fight Night: Rockhold vs. Branch
|
|align=center|2
|align=center|4:04
|Pittsburgh, Pennsylvania, United States
|
|-
|Loss
|align=center|15–3
|Michael Bisping
|KO (punches)
|UFC 199
|
|align=center|1
|align=center|3:36
|Inglewood, California, United States
|
|-
|Win
|align=center|15–2
|Chris Weidman
|TKO (punches)
|UFC 194
|
|align=center|4
|align=center|3:12
|Las Vegas, Nevada, United States
|
|-
|Win
|align=center|14–2
|Lyoto Machida
|Submission (rear-naked choke)
|UFC on Fox: Machida vs. Rockhold
|
|align=center|2
|align=center|2:31
|Newark, New Jersey, United States
|
|-
|Win
|align=center|13–2
|Michael Bisping
|Submission (guillotine choke)
|UFC Fight Night: Rockhold vs. Bisping
|
|align=center|2
|align=center|0:57
|Sydney, New South Wales, Australia
|
|-
|Win
|align=center|12–2
|Tim Boetsch
|Submission (inverted triangle kimura)
|UFC 172
|
|align=center|1
|align=center|2:08
|Baltimore, Maryland, United States
|
|-
|Win
|align=center|11–2
|Costas Philippou
|TKO (kick to the body)
|UFC Fight Night: Rockhold vs. Philippou
|
|align=center|1
|align=center|2:31
|Duluth, Georgia, United States
|
|-
|Loss
|align=center|10–2
|Vitor Belfort
|KO (spinning heel kick and punches)
|UFC on FX: Belfort vs. Rockhold
|
|align=center|1
|align=center|2:32
|Jaraguá do Sul, Santa Catarina, Brazil
|
|-
|Win
|align=center|10–1
|Tim Kennedy
|Decision (unanimous)
|Strikeforce: Rockhold vs. Kennedy
|
|align=center|5
|align=center|5:00
|Portland, Oregon, United States
|
|-
|Win
|align=center|9–1
|Keith Jardine
|TKO (punches)
|Strikeforce: Rockhold vs. Jardine
|
|align=center|1
|align=center|4:26
|Paradise, Nevada, United States
|
|-
|Win
|align=center|8–1
|Ronaldo Souza
|Decision (unanimous)
|Strikeforce: Barnett vs. Kharitonov
|
|align=center|5
|align=center|5:00
|Cincinnati, Ohio, United States
|
|-
|Win
|align=center|7–1
|Paul Bradley
|TKO (knees to the body)
|Strikeforce Challengers: Kaufman vs. Hashi
|
|align=center|1
|align=center|2:24
|San Jose, California, United States
|
|-
|Win
|align=center|6–1
|Jesse Taylor
|Submission (rear-naked choke)
|Strikeforce Challengers: Gurgel vs. Evangelista
|
|align=center|1
|align=center|3:42
|Fresno, California, United States
|
|-
|Win
|align=center|5–1
|Cory Devela
|Submission (rear-naked choke)
|Strikeforce Challengers: Villasenor vs. Cyborg
|
|align=center|1
|align=center|0:30
|Kent, Washington, United States
|
|-
|Win
|align=center|4–1
|Buck Meredith
|Submission (rear-naked choke)
|Strikeforce: Shamrock vs. Diaz
|
|align=center|1
|align=center|4:07
|San Jose, California, United States
|
|-
|Win
|align=center|3–1
|Nik Theotikos
|Submission (rear-naked choke)
|Strikeforce: Destruction
|
|align=center|1
|align=center|3:06
|San Jose, California, United States
|
|-
|Win
|align=center|2–1
|Josh Neal
|TKO (submission to punches)
|Strikeforce: Young Guns II
|
|align=center|1
|align=center|1:49
|San Jose, California, United States
|
|-
|Loss
|align=center|1–1
| Tony Rubalcava
|TKO (punches)
|Melee on the Mountain
|
|align=center|1
|align=center|2:46
|Friant, California, United States
|
|-
|Win
|align=center|1–0
| Mike Martinez
|Submission (armbar)
|Melee on the Mountain
|
|align=center|1
|align=center|2:44
|Friant, California, United States
|

Pay-per-view bouts

See also
 List of Strikeforce alumni
 List of male mixed martial artists

References

External links
 
 

|-

|-

1984 births
Living people
American male sport wrestlers
American male judoka
American male mixed martial artists
Mixed martial artists from California
Middleweight mixed martial artists
Mixed martial artists utilizing Muay Thai
Mixed martial artists utilizing judo
Mixed martial artists utilizing wrestling
Mixed martial artists utilizing Brazilian jiu-jitsu
American people who self-identify as being of Native American descent
American Muay Thai practitioners
People from Santa Cruz County, California
American practitioners of Brazilian jiu-jitsu
People awarded a black belt in Brazilian jiu-jitsu
Strikeforce (mixed martial arts) champions
Ultimate Fighting Championship champions
Ultimate Fighting Championship male fighters